The Battle of Nowshera was fought in Nowshera in March 1823 between the Yusufzai Afghans, supported by the Peshawar sardars, alongside Azim Khan Barakzai, the Afghan governor of Peshawar, where they would face the Sikh armies led by Maharaja Ranjit Singh.  Azim Khan was a half-brother of Dost Mohammad Khan, future ruler of Kabul, and later Afghanistan. The battle was a victory for the Sikhs, successfully defeating Azim Khan's armies. This victory allowed them to begin to their occupation of the Peshawar Valley.

Following their victory, the Sikhs destroyed the Afghan royal court and the fort of Bala Hissar, Peshawar. However, Hari Singh Nalwa soon commenced the reconstruction of the fort.

Background 
In 1817, Ranjit Singh capitalized on the Durrani Civil War by forcing the ruler of Multan, Muzaffar Khan Sadozai to accept Sikh suzerainty and pay tribute to the Sikh Empire. The following year, Ranjit Singh marched on Multan seeking to eliminate all remaining Sadozai power in the region. Regional governors were unable to support Muzaffar Khan, leaving him to face the Sikh attack alone. Muzaffar Khan's forces fought valiantly due to the fact that they believed they would face complete massacre in retribution of Ahmad Shah's earlier campaigns in the Punjab decades prior. Ranjit Singh's armies were vastly superior in men and equipment, also trained by French and Italian officers. The siege of Multan lasted 82 days, ending in a Sikh victory as Muzaffar Khan alongside his five sons and one daughter joined in the defense and were killed. When Multan was secured, the Sikhs pillaged the city and slaughtered the populace of the city, also killing many Sadozais, and those who survived were taken to Lahore.

In 1819, the Sikhs conquered Srinagar, the capital of Kashmir from Durrani rule, alongside Dera Ghazi Khan, with thousands of refugees flooding to Kabul following the Sikh conquests. Sardar Yar Muhammad Khan in Peshawar accepted Sikh rule and paid tribute in return for remaining governor of the city. This pushed the Sikh Empire's borders to the mouth of the Khyber pass as a result. Ranjit Singh withdrew most of his troops, leaving a small garrison at Nowshera.

Yar Muhammad's submission to the Sikhs was seen as unacceptable to Sardar Azim Khan, but couldn't do much for over four years. However, in the winter of 1822, he finally marched to Peshawar with thousands of Khattak, Afridis, and Yusufzai warriors flocked to his banner for war, calling upon a Jihad further established by local pirs and Mullahs. Sardar Yar Muhammad had little choice but to follow his half-brother's course of action, though in secrecy holding contact with Ranjit Singh, eventually persuading Azim Khan to send him to negotiate with Ranjit Singh. After reaching the safety of the Sikh camp, Yar Muhammad defected. Shah Shuja Durrani also sent forces, hoping to regain his throne if Azim Khan was defeated.

Battle 
The Afghan and Sikh armies met in March 1823 outside Nowshera. Azim Khan distrusted the levies from the Khyber region for they had only taken commands from their pirs. Azim Khan's army was also poorly trained, with his tribal levies having no real military training, alongside many being children, some as young as twelve. Ranjit Singh had the advantage of superior numbers and quality, with European advisors having drilled his troops.

Ranjit Singh by this point had brought up his army to the east of Hund, on the opposite bank, a lashkar of thousands of fighters led by Syed Ahmad Shah of Buner had started forming. Despite the odds, Ranjit Singh's forces crossed the Indus under fierce attacks. The lashkar then withdrew to Pir Sabak hill where they concentrated their forces and hoped to gain support from the Durrani troops and their artillery under Azim Khan.

Azem Khan for unknown reasons, did not cross the Kabul River straight away to link up with the tribesmen. Ranjit Singh realising the situation concentrated his artillery and infantry on the lashkar and left a small detachment under General Ventura to forestall any crossing by Azim Khan. What proceeded was ferocious hand-to-hand fights between the Tribal lashkar and the Sikh Khalsa Army. Finally after the fourth attack, led personally by Ranjit Singh and his personal bodyguard themselves the hill was carried. By the late evening the lashkar realised that Azim Khan had withdrawn from the battle and abandoned his allies. This coupled with the withering attacks by the Sikh artillery, broke the lashkar's resolve and thought willing to rally again under their Pir Ahmad Shah they dispersed in disarray, the Sikh victory was complete.

Aftermath 
Swiftly securing Nowshera, Ranjit Singh's forces captured Peshawar and reached Jamrud itself. Destroying the remains of Durrani power, they reduced Peshawar to ruins and secured the Khyber Pass so no Durrani reinforcements could threaten them again.

The tribesman of Khattaks and Yousafzais suffered enormous casualties due to the Sikh artillery and the seeming betrayal by the Muhammadzai Sardars led to a lack of trust in the Durranis' word from then onwards.

Azim Khan's retreat has never been explained fully, some say he believed his brother had returned to recapture Peshawar at the behest of the Sikhs, others attribute his retreat to cowardice or fear of being cut off by the ferocious Sikh attack. He did not recover from the shock of the defeat and died shortly after the battle.

Ranjit Singh's victory was to mark the highpoint of his campaigns, his empire now stretched from the Khyber Pass to the west, to the north Kashmir and to the south Multan.

See also 
Hari Singh Nalwa
 Battle of Jamrud
 Paolo Avitabile
Syed Ahmad Barelvi

References

Sources

Nowshera
Battles involving the Sikhs
Conflicts in 1823
1823 in Asia
March 1823 events